Application Networks Inc. (AppNet) was a Palo Alto-based company, provider of JRisk, a packaged financial risk management software to use on-premises or as part of cloud computing environments. Its customers included global banks. Banks used JRisk for the risk management of their portfolio of securities, OTC contracts and financial derivative transactions.

Application Networks Inc. was acquired by Reuters in June 2006.

References 

 
 
 
 
 
 

1998 establishments in California
Cloud computing providers
Companies based in Palo Alto, California
Companies established in 1998
Software companies based in the San Francisco Bay Area
Defunct software companies of the United States
1998 establishments in the United States
Software companies established in 1998